Pash (9 September 1950 – 23 March 1988) was the pen name of Avtar Singh Sandhu, one of the major poets in the Punjabi literature of the 1970s. He was killed by extremists on 23 March 1988. His strongly left-wing views were reflected in his poetry.

Early life and activism
Pash was born as Avtar Singh Sandhu in 1950 in a small village called Talwandi Salem in Jalandhar district of Punjab, in a middle-class farmers family. His father Sohan Singh Sandhu was a soldier in the Indian army who also composed poetry as a hobby. Pash grew up in the midst of the Naxalite movement, a revolutionary movement waged in Punjab against the landlords, industrialists, traders, etc. who control the means of production. This was in the midst of the Green revolution which had addressed India's problem of famine using high yield crops, but had also unconsciously led to other forms of inequities in Punjab.

In 1970, he published his first book of revolutionary poems, Loh-Katha (Iron Tale), at the age of 18. His militant and provocative tone raised the ire of the establishment and a murder charge was brought against him. He spent nearly two years in jail, before being finally acquitted.
In 1972, the 22-year-old started a 
On acquittal, he became involved in Punjab's Maoist front, editing a literary magazine, Siarh (The Plow Line). He became a popular political figure on the left during this period and was awarded a fellowship at the Punjabi Academy of Letters in 1985. He toured the United Kingdom and the United States the following year; while in the U.S., he became involved with the Anti-47 Front, opposing Sikh extremist violence. His words had a great influence on the minds of the people.

Assassination 
At the beginning of 1988 Pash was in Punjab for the renewal of his visa from the United States. A day before leaving for Delhi, however, he was gunned down by gunners along with his friend Hans Raj on the well in his village on 23 March 1988. Pash was assassinated by the Khalistani terrorists for being a vocal critic of Jarnail Singh Bhindranwale.

Literary works

Loh-katha (Iron-Tale) (1970),
Uddian Bazan Magar (Following The Flying Hawks) (1973),
Saadey Samiyaan Vich (In Our Times) (1978), and
Khilre Hoye Varkey (Scattered pages) (1989)

Khilre Hoey Varkey was posthumously published in 1989 after his death, followed by his journals and letters. A selection of his poems in Punjabi, Inkar, was published in Lahore in 1997. His poems have been translated in many languages including other Indian languages, Nepali and English. Poems written by Paarsh are popular in India, especially in Punjab and North India. Recitations of his poems are often carried out, especially on the weekends close to his death anniversary.

Sab Ton Khatarnaak 
One of Pash's most popular and often cited poems is titled ਸਬ ਤੋਂ ਖ਼ਤਰਨਾਕ ਹੁੰਦਾ ਹੈ ਸਾਡੇ  ਸੁਪਨਿਆਂ ਦਾ ਮਰ ਜਾਣਾ।  सबसे ख़तरनाक होता है हमारे सपनों का मर जाना (Sabse Khatarnak hota hai hamare sapnon ka mar jaana - meaning: The most dangerous thing is the demise of our dreams).

In 2005, this poem was included in NCERT's Hindi book for 11th standard.

References

External links
Pash's Poetry
Pash by Tejwant Singh Gill

See also
Arjan Singh Mastana
Baldev Singh Mann
Chanan Singh Dhoot
Darshan Singh Canadian
Deepak Dhawan
Gursharan Singh (theatre director)
Jaimal Singh Padda
Nidhan Singh Gudhan
Professor Ravinder Singh Ravi
Sarvan Singh Cheema
Sumeet Preetlari
Punjab insurgency

Indian male poets
1950 births
1988 deaths
Indian Sikhs
Punjabi-language poets
Punjabi people
20th-century Indian poets
Poets from Punjab, India
People from Jalandhar district
20th-century Indian male writers